Francisco Ezequiel Jurado Contreras (born 11 July 1955) is a Mexican politician from the National Action Party. From 2000 to 2003 he served as Deputy of the LVIII Legislature of the Mexican Congress representing Chihuahua.

References

1955 births
Living people
Politicians from Chihuahua (state)
Institutional Revolutionary Party politicians
21st-century Mexican politicians
Deputies of the LVIII Legislature of Mexico
Members of the Chamber of Deputies (Mexico) for Chihuahua (state)